"Not Going Home" is a song by Canadian electronic duo DVBBS and Dutch DJ and music producer CMC$, featuring vocals from Polish singer-songwriter Gia Koka. The song was written by Gia Koka, CMC$ and DVBBS, with production handled by the latter two. It was released to digital retailers on November 18, 2016, as the third single from DVBBS' third extended play, Beautiful Disaster.

Background
"'Not Going Home' is sort of an anthem, a reminder that we all have roots and we all come the same place. For some home is where the heart is and for others home is where the music is," DVBBS said.

Music video
The music video was released on March 14, 2017. The video shows DVBBS and Gia Koka walking around in Los Angeles, plastering "Not Going Home" stickers.

Critical reception
Markos Papadatos of Digital Journal wrote that the song "has a feel-good and liberating vibe to it, coupled with a catchy beat". Connor Jones of We Got This Covered wrote: "A mellow synth pluck kicks things off with a soothing chord progression alongside minimal beats, before the pace picks up in the drops with staccato bass stabs and upbeat rhythms. The song balances some catchy female vocal hooks courtesy of Gia Koka, layered over an uplifting dance backdrop."

Charts

Weekly charts

Year-end charts

Certifications

References

2016 singles
2016 songs
CMC$ songs